Yarraden is a coastal rural locality in the Shire of Cook, Queensland, Australia. In the  Yarraden had a population of 11 people.

Geography
Yarraden is on the eastern side of Cape York Peninsula bordering the Coral Sea. The Great Dividing Range passes through the locality from the north (Coen) to the south (Dixie). The Peninsula Developmental Road passes through in from north (Coen) to the south-east (Laura).

The Great Dividing Range creates a watershed with the creeks and rivers rising to the east of the range flowing into the Coral Sea, while the creeks and rivers rising to the west of the range flow into the Gulf of Carpentaria.

Ebagoola is an abandoned gold mining town.

Curlew Range is a mountain range.

There are numerous mountains in the locality, from north to south:

The Gorge is a gorge.

Only a small section in the north-east of the locality is coastal, facing Princess Charlotte Bay, which was named by naval officer Lieutenant Charles Jeffreys (or Jefferys) serving on the HM Colonial brig Kangaroo on 30 May 1815.

A small area in the north-east of the locality (north of Annie River) is within the Lama Lama National Park.

Apart from the national park, the predominant land use is grazing on native vegetation and there are a number of homesteads in the locality:
 Artemis
 Astrea
 Crystal Vale
 Ebagoola
 Glen Garland
 Lily Vale
 Musgrave
 New Bamboo
 Running Creek
 Strathhaven
 Strathmay
 Violet Vale
 Yarraden

History
The town of Ebagoola was surveyed in 1900 by James Dickie.

The town of Yarraden was established to support the Lukin River gold field discovered in 1901. In March 1903, its gold reefs were described as "amongst the largest and richest". The two major gold mines were Golden King and Savannah. Golden King was worked from 1901 to 1914 and in 1917 and 1921. Savannah was worked from 1901 to 1907 and in 1912.

Ebagoolah Provisional School opened in 1905. On 1 January 1909 it became Ebagoolah State School.  It closed in 1914.

In the  Yarraden had a population of 11 people. In the  Yarraden had a population of 11 people.

Heritage listings 
Yarraden has a number of heritage-listed sites, including:
 Ebagoola Township and Battery
 Peninsula Developmental Road: Musgrave Telegraph Station

Transport 
There are a number of airstrips in the locality:

 Astrea Station airstrip
 Ancilia Station airstrip
 Leconsfield Station airstrip
Lily Vale Station airstrip
 Minka Station airstrip on Yarraden Station
Musgrave Station airstrip
Strathaven Station Airstrip
 Violet Vale Station airstrip
Yarraden Airstrip
Yarraden Station airstrip

References

Further reading

External links 
 

 
Shire of Cook
Coastline of Queensland
Localities in Queensland